Black Spruce Rugby are a Canadian rugby union team based in Fredericton, New Brunswick. The team plays in the Rugby Canada Super League and draws most of its players from the New Brunswick Rugby Union.

The Spruce play their home games at Loyalists RFC in Fredericton.

History
In 1998, Rugby Canada and the provincial unions agreed to form the Rugby Canada Super League. Fourteen unions and sub-unions were invited to compete in the new semi-professional league. 9 teams played in the inaugural RCSL season - Black Spruce Rugby was one of the 9 original teams others were The Rock, NS Keiths, Montreal Olympics, Manitoba Buffalo, The Prairie Fire, Calgary Maverics, Edmonton Gold and the Crimson Tide.

Canadian rugby union teams
Sports teams in New Brunswick
Sport in Fredericton